FK Karlskrona is a Swedish football club located in Karlskrona.

Background
The club was formed on October 31, 2012, as a result of the merger of Lyckeby GoIF and Karlskrona AIF. Karlskrona AIF was formed in 1968 as a result of the merger of Saltö BK, Karlskrona BK and Björkholmens IF.

Since its founding Karlskrona has participated mainly in the middle lower divisions of the Swedish football league system.  They did play second-tier football in Division 2 Södra and Division 1 Södra in the 1980s and early 1990s. The club currently plays in Division 1 Södra which is the third tier of Swedish football. They play their home matches at the Västra Mark IP in Karlskrona. Their attendance record is the 3,893 spectators against Västra Frolunda IF in 1981.

On October 31, 2012, the club merged with Lyckeby GoIF and changed its name to FK Karlskrona. After winning Division 2 Södra Götaland in 2016 the club was promoted to Division 1.

FK Karlskrona is affiliated to the Blekinge Fotbollförbund.

Season to season

External links
 FK Karlskrona – Official Website

Footnotes

FK Karlskrona
Football clubs in Blekinge County
Association football clubs established in 1968
1968 establishments in Sweden